The 1975 Individual Speedway World Championship was the 30th edition of the official World Championship to determine the world champion rider.

Ole Olsen won his second World title in front of 81,000 at Wembley Stadium in London with a 15 point maximum from his five rides. Defending champion Anders Michanek finished second and England's John Louis won the run-off for the bronze medal, defeating four time world champion Ivan Mauger. Some criticism was aimed at the track surface which was described as dusty and dry.

Format changes
The format of the Championship changed for the 1975 event. This time the British riders (not including Commonwealth riders for the first time) were allowed four places in the World Final to be held in England. All other nations had to go through the European Final route to provide the remaining 12 riders for the World Final. The European Final qualification route included a new Intercontinental Final which feature riders from the United States for the first time for many years.

First round
British Qualifying - 16 British riders to British Final
Oceania Qualifying - 5 riders to Intercontinental Final
United States Qualifying - 2 riders to Intercontinental Final
Continental Qualifying - 16 to Continental Final
Norwegian Final - 3 to Nordic Final
Swedish Qualifying & Final - 8 to Nordic Final
Danish Qualifying - 3 to Nordic Final
Finnish Qualifying - 2 to Nordic Final

British Qualifying

Continental Qualifying

Swedish Qualifying

Swedish Final
 May 21, 1975
  Norrköping
 First 8 to Nordic Final

Norwegian Final
 Skien
 First 3 to Nordic Final

Second round
Nordic Final -  9 to Intercontinental Final

Nordic Final
 June 1, 1975
  Skien
 First 9 to Intercontinental Final

Third round
Intercontinental Final - 8 to European Final
Continental Final - 8 to European Final

Intercontinental Final
 June 3, 1975
  Göteborg, Ullevi
 First 8 to European Final plus 1 reserve

Continental Final
 June 22, 1975
  Leningrad
 First 8 to European Final

Fourth round
British Final - 4 to World Final
European Final - 12 to World Final

British Final
 July 30, 1975
  Coventry, Brandon Stadium
 First 4 to World Final plus 1 reserve

European Final
 August 24, 1975
  Bydgoszcz
 First 12 to World Final plus 1 reserve

World Final
September 6, 1975
 London, Wembley Stadium
Referee: Torrie Kittelsen

References

1975
World Individual
Speedway competitions in the United Kingdom
Individual Speedway World Championship
Individual Speedway World Championship